Marco Mathis (born 7 April 1994) is a German cyclist, who most recently rode for UCI WorldTeam . In October 2020, he was named in the startlist for the 2020 Giro d'Italia.

Major results
2012
 1st Stage 1 Tour de la région de Łódź
2015
 1st  Team time trial, National Road Championships
2016
 1st  Time trial, UCI Road World Under-23 Championships
 1st  Team time trial, National Road Championships
 National Track Championships
1st  Team pursuit
1st  Individual pursuit
 3rd Overall Dookoła Mazowsza
2017
 8th Time trial, UEC European Road Championships
2019
 2nd  Team relay, UEC European Road Championships

Grand Tour general classification results timeline

References

External links

1994 births
Living people
German male cyclists
People from Bodenseekreis
Sportspeople from Tübingen (region)
Cyclists from Baden-Württemberg